Adolf Kunstwadl (8 February 1940 – 12 November 2016) was a German professional footballer who played for Bayern Munich and Wacker München.

References

1940 births
2016 deaths
Footballers from Munich
German footballers
FC Bayern Munich footballers
FC Wacker München players
Bundesliga players
Association football defenders